Iran participated at the 2018 Asian Para Games which was held in Jakarta, Indonesia from 6 to 13 October 2018. In July 2019, Iran had a bronze medal upgraded to silver due to doping violation of an Uzbek athlete.

Competitors 
A total of 210 athletes, consisting of 137 men and 73 women, competed for Iran in the 2018 Asian Para Games in 13 sports. The following is a list showing the number of competitors by sport and gender.:

Medal summary

     
|  style="text-align:left; width:78%; vertical-align:top;"|

|  style="text-align:left; width:22%; vertical-align:top;"|

|  style="text-align:left; width:22%; vertical-align:top;"|

Multiple medalists

See also
 Iran at the 2018 Asian Games
 Iran at the 2018 Winter Paralympics

References

External links
 Official website
 APC website

2018
Asian Para Games
Nations at the 2018 Asian Para Games